Mullumbimby Giants is a rugby league side from Mullumbimby, New South Wales, Australia which competes in the Northern Rivers Regional Rugby League competition.

Mullumbimby Giants is one of the oldest rugby league clubs in Australia, playing its first competition game of rugby league in 1909. Formed between 1900 and 1903, it is now one of the oldest rugby league teams still competing in Australia.
'One of Australia's earliest Rugby League Towns'. 
quote taken from Jim Huxley's story on 'Mullumbimby sets the standard' Rugby League Week, 5 July 1984 page 25. 
Mullumbimby Giants play in all three senior competitions; A Grade, Reserve Grade and Under 18s.
The Giants' junior teams compete in the Group 18 Rugby League competition.
Giants are represented in the junior competitions from under-7s to under-16s.

Premierships
Mullumbimby's A grade side won premierships in: 1924,1960,2004,2007.
Mullumbimby's Reserve grade side won premierships in: 1960,1985,2008, 2012
Mullumbimby's Under 18's side won premierships in: 1958,1960,1966,1988,2007,2008, 2012

Notable Juniors
Albert Broomham (1908-14 North Sydney Bears)
Harold King (1922-25 St George Dragons)
Glen Godbee (1998 Gold Coast Chargers)
Jacob Miller (2011- West Tigers , Hull F.C. & Wakefield Trinity)
Dane Chisholm (2011 Melbourne Storm)
Cody Nelson (2014 Gold Coast Titans, Parramatta Eels)
Jy Hitchcox (2014 West Tigers)
Jack Gosiewski (2016- South Sydney Rabbitohs)
Aaron Booth (2020- Melbourne Storm)
Ken Mcmorrow, Mcmorrow Captain/Coached the A grade premiership winning team in 1960.
Vic Armbruster

Notable Coaches
Ken Mcmorrow. 1959,60.
Bill Petley. 1964.
Peter Burke. 1967.
Peter Hanna. 1970,71.
Joe Grainey. 1972,74.
Elwyn Walters. 1978-79,1981-82.
Neil Pringle. 1984-85.
Con Theodossiou. 1988-1992 1996-2000
Arthur Sauverain. 2001-2003
Graham Eadie. 2012

References 

Rugby league teams in New South Wales
Rugby clubs established in 1909
1909 establishments in Australia